Aranlı may refer to:
Aranlı, Bilasuvar, Azerbaijan
Aranlı, Imishli, Azerbaijan